Savshibhai Kanjibhai Makwana became a member of the 13th Lok Sabha of India from Surendranagar Lok Sabha seat of Gujarat. Makwana is a member of the Indian National Congress Party And won by 25,990 votes. Makwana belong to the Koli caste of Gujarat.

Savshibhai Makwana wrote a book in Gujarati language named Zadna Parakha Far Par Thi.

References 

Koli people
People from Surendranagar district
India MPs 1999–2004
1932 births
Living people